Gresse is a municipality in the Ludwigslust-Parchim district, in Mecklenburg-Vorpommern, Germany. During World War II, one of the German death marches of Allied prisoners-of-war passed through the town. Sixty of the prisoners-of-war died at Gresse on 19 April 1945 in a "friendly fire" incident when strafed by a flight of Royal Air Force Hawker Typhoons which mistook them for retreating German soldiers.

References

Ludwigslust-Parchim